Hohenbergia lanata is a plant species in the genus Hohenbergia. This species is endemic to Brazil.

References

lanata
Flora of Brazil